The Great Gay Road is a 1931 British drama film directed by Sinclair Hill and starring Stewart Rome, Frank Stanmore and Kate Cutler.

It was adapted from the 1910 novel The Great Gay Road by Tom Gallon which had previously been made in a silent film The Great Gay Road in 1920. It was made by Stoll Pictures at Cricklewood Studios. Location filming was done around Tunbridge Wells.

Cast
 Stewart Rome as Hilary Kite
 Frank Stanmore as Crook Perkins
 Kate Cutler as Aunt Jessie
 Arthur Hardy as Sir Crispin
 Pat Paterson as Nancy
 Billy Milton as Rodney
 Hugh E. Wright as Backus
 Frederick Lloyd as Colonel Trigg
 Ethel Warwick as Lizzie
 Wally Patch as Joe
  Petra Charpentier  as Laura  
 Alf Cordery as Big Jim  
 Aubrey Fitzgerald as Waiter 
 Charles Paton as Innkeeper  
 Bruce Winston as Man in the Car

References

Bibliography
 Low, Rachael. Filmmaking in 1930s Britain. George Allen & Unwin, 1985.
 Wood, Linda. British Films, 1927-1939. British Film Institute, 1986.

External links

1931 films
1931 drama films
Films directed by Sinclair Hill
Films based on British novels
British drama films
Remakes of British films
Sound film remakes of silent films
Films set in England
Stoll Pictures films
Films shot at Cricklewood Studios
Films shot in Kent
British black-and-white films
1930s English-language films
1930s British films